Glenn Edsel Summers (February 19, 1925 – February 16, 2020) was an American attorney and politician in the state of Florida.

Summers was born in Bristol, Florida. He was a veteran of World War II and served in the United States Navy. Summers received his bachelor's and law degrees from University of Florida. Summers practiced law in Bristol, Florida. He also served as county judge for Liberty County, Florida from 1976 until his retirement in 1997. Summers also lived in Estiffanulga, Florida after he retired as county judge. He served in the Florida House of Representatives from 1947 to 1951, as a Democrat, representing Liberty County.

References

2020 deaths
1925 births
Florida state court judges
Democratic Party members of the Florida House of Representatives
People from Liberty County, Florida
20th-century American politicians
United States Navy personnel of World War II
Military personnel from Florida
University of Florida alumni
Florida lawyers
20th-century American lawyers